Charles Ward may refer to:

Charles Ward (cricketer, born 1875) (1875–1954), English cricketer
 Charles Ward (cricketer, born 1838) (1838–1892), English cricketer and clergyman

Charles Ward (Deputy Governor of Bombay), Deputy Governor of Bombay, 1682–1683

Charles Ward (VC) (1877–1921), English recipient of the Victoria Cross
Charles B. Ward (1879–1946), American politician, U.S. Representative from New York
 Charles Caleb Ward (1831–1896), Canadian painter
 Charles Dudley Robert Ward, known as Dudley Ward, (1827–1913), New Zealand judge and Member of Parliament
Charles Willis Ward (1856–1920), American businessman and conservationist
 Charles William Ward, known as Chuck Ward (1894–1969), American professional baseball player
Charlie Ward (born 1970), American professional basketball player, Heisman trophy winner
Charlie Ward (golfer) (1911–2001), English professional golfer
Charlie Ward (footballer) (born 1995), British footballer
Charlie Ward (fighter), Irish MMA fighter
Charles Ward, British co-founder of Rockfield Studios

See also
 Charles Dexter Ward, title character of The Case of Charles Dexter Ward, a novel by H. P. Lovecraft